Sad Sour Future is the fifth studio album by American musical group The Poison Control Center, released on May 18, 2010.

References

2010 albums
The Poison Control Center albums